Woo, WoO, WOO, W.O.O. and variants may refer to:

People
Woo or Wu, romanization of several East Asian names:
 Hu (surname): 胡, 瓠, 護, 戶, 扈, 虎, 呼, 忽, 斛
 Wu (surname): 吳, 伍, 武, 仵, 烏, 鄔, 巫
 Ng (name): 吳, 伍
 Woo (Korean surname), a Korean surname 우
 Woo (Korean given name), a Korean given name 우
 Woo, Łukasz Obrzut, nickname of Polish-American basketball player based on the pronunciation of his first name (Woo-kosh)

Film and TV
 Woo (film), a 1998 romantic comedy
 "Woooo!", a 2008 television episode of How I Met Your Mother
 Woo, a character in the King of the Monsters series of video games
 WoO, an alien creature in Bio Planet WoO, a Japanese television show
 Woo, a fictional monster in the Ultraman television series
 Woo, a character in the movie The Big Lebowski
 Woo, or WoO, also known as WWOO WWoO, abbreviation for The Wizard of Oz
 "Woooo!", a catchphrase by pro wrestler Ric Flair

Music
 WoO, ("Works without opus number"), a cataloging system for Beethoven's (and some other composers') works
 Woo (music group), a British experimental band
 Woo (soundtrack), a soundtrack album from the 1998 film
 "The Woo", a song by Pop Smoke
 "Woo", a song by Rihanna from Anti
 Woo!, a 2003 EP by Tilly and the Wall
 "Woo Baby", a song by Pop Smoke

Transport
 Wool railway station, Dorset, England (National Rail station code)

Other uses
 College of Wooster
 World of Outlaws, a car racing organization
 WOO (Philadelphia), a broadcasting station which operated from 1922 to 1928
 The callsign WOO, used by the AT&T High Seas Service transmitter station in Ocean Gate, New Jersey 
 Woo, a derogatory term for pseudoscience and other non-evidence-based beliefs.
 Courtship, also known as "wooing"
 W, a letter of the alphabet

See also
Woo Hoo (disambiguation)
Woo Woo (disambiguation)
Wu (disambiguation)
Woo! Yeah!